Sabanejewia romanica (Romanian loach) is a species of cyprinid fish in the family Cobitidae. It was originally placed in the genus Cobitis.

It is found only in Romania.

Sources

External links 
 

Cobitidae
Cyprinid fish of Europe
Fish described in 1943
Taxonomy articles created by Polbot